Amlodipine/benazepril, sold under the brand name Lotrel among others, is a fixed-dose combination medication used to treat high blood pressure. It is a combination of amlodipine, as the besilate, a calcium channel blocker, and benazepril, an angiotensin converting enzyme inhibitor. It may be used if a single agent is not sufficient. It is taken by mouth.

Common side effects include cough, dizziness, and swelling. Serious side effects may include angioedema, myocardial infarction, high blood potassium, liver problems, and low blood pressure. Use in pregnancy is not recommended. Amlodipine works by increasing the size of arteries while benazepril works by decreasing renin-angiotensin-aldosterone system activity.

The combination was approved for medical use in the United States in 1995. It is available as a generic medication. In 2020, it was the 169th most commonly prescribed medication in the United States, with more than 3million prescriptions.

Medical uses
It is used to treat high blood pressure. It is not a first-line treatment.

References

External links 
 

Combination drugs
Novartis brands
Prodrugs
Wikipedia medicine articles ready to translate